Pir Marzban (also Romanized as Pīr Marzbān; also known as Pīrmazabān and Pīr Mehzābān) is a village in Zarrineh Rud Rural District, Bizineh Rud District, Khodabandeh County, Zanjan Province, Iran. At the 2006 census, its population was 776, in 174 families.

References 

Populated places in Khodabandeh County